The voco Grand Central Glasgow (usually known by locals by its former name, the Central Hotel) is a large 4-star hotel in the centre of Glasgow, Scotland.

The hotel forms the front of the Glasgow Central railway station on Gordon Street, directly adjoining onto the station concourse. It was one of Glasgow's most prestigious hotels in its heyday, hosting residents such as John F. Kennedy, Frank Sinatra, Winston Churchill, Gene Kelly and Laurel and Hardy.

History
The hotel was designed by Robert Rowand Anderson, in 'Queen Anne style'; he also furnished the public rooms.  The hotel was constructed by the Caledonian Railway and was completed in 1883 as the Central Station Hotel. It was extended, along with the station, in 1901–1906. The hotel extension was designed by James Miller and it opened on 15 April 1907. It was later renamed the Central Hotel. The world's first long-distance television pictures were transmitted to the hotel on 24 May 1927 by John Logie Baird.

Following the break-up of British Transport Hotels in the early 1980s, the hotel was sold in 1983 and passed through the hands of various private operators. It was operated by Choice Hotels International for many years as the Quality Hotel Central Glasgow. In February 2009, The Real Hotel Company plc was forced into administration, and the hotel subsequently closed amid concerns of asbestos contamination and structural deterioration.

In June 2009, it was revealed that Principal Hayley Group had acquired the hotel. They refurbished it and re-opened it as the Grand Central Hotel on 9 September 2010. Together with the rest of Glasgow Central railway station, the hotel is protected as a category A listed building.

Principal hotel company was sold to InterContinental Hotels Group in 2018. The hotel closed in 2020 for an extensive renovation and was rebranded within IHG's voco chain as voco Grand Central Glasgow. It reopened on April 26, 2021.

References

External links
voco Grand Central Glasgow official website
voco Grand Central Glasgow official chain website
Grand Central Hotel project details - Clyde Waterfront Regeneration

Hotels in Glasgow
Railway hotels in Scotland
James Miller buildings
Hotel buildings completed in 1883
Hotels established in 1883
19th century in Scotland
Category A listed buildings in Glasgow
Listed hotels in Scotland
Clock towers in the United Kingdom